Wow Comics was an ongoing monthly Golden Age comic book anthology series published by Fawcett Comics from winter 1940 to August 1948. 

From issue #9 to #58, the book's cover features were the solo adventures of Fawcett's Mary Marvel character. Other characters included Mr. Scarlet, Commando Yank and Phantom Eagle.

The title's inaugural issue was the first comic book mentioning of Gotham City. Wow Comics later evolved into a boys' title beginning with issue #59.

Publication history 
The book changed the format to a Western comic and was renamed Real Hero Western with issue #70, and Western Hero from issue #76 until the book's final issue, #112, in 1952.

References

External links

1940 comics debuts
1948 comics endings
Magazines established in 1940
Magazines disestablished in 1948
Fawcett Comics titles
Golden Age comics titles
Comics magazines published in the United States